This is a list of the main career statistics of professional American tennis player Jessica Pegula.

Performance timelines 

Only main-draw results in WTA Tour, Grand Slam tournaments, Fed Cup/Billie Jean King Cup and Olympic Games are included in win–loss records.

Singles 
Current after the 2023 Dubai Championships.

Doubles 
Current after the 2023 Dubai Championships.

Significant finals

Grand Slam tournament finals

Doubles: 1 (runner-up)

WTA 1000 finals

Singles: 2 (1 title, 1 runner-up)

Doubles: 2 (2 titles)

WTA career finals

Singles: 6 (2 titles, 4 runner-ups)

Doubles: 7 (6 titles, 1 runner-up)

WTA Challenger finals

Singles: 1 (runner-up)

Doubles: 2 (1 title, 1 runner-up)

ITF Circuit finals

Singles: 6 (6 runner–ups)

Doubles: 17 (7 titles, 10 runner–ups)

WTA Tour career earnings
Current through the 2023 Qatar Total Open.

Career Grand Slam statistics

Grand Slam tournament seedings 
The tournaments won by Pegula are in boldface, and advanced into finals by Pegula are in italics.

Best Grand Slam results details 
Grand Slam winners are in boldface, and runner–ups are in italics.

Singles

Record against other players

No. 1 wins

Record against top 10 players 

 She has a  record against players who were, at the time the match was played, ranked in the top 10.

Notes

References

Pegula, Jessica